A Murshid is one of the 12 ranks of Imam in Alevism.

Turkish culture
Alevism
Islam in Turkey
Shia Islam in Turkey